José Conrado Hernández Santiago (February 19, 1849 – June 20, 1932) served as Chief Justice of the Supreme Court of Puerto Rico from 1909 to 1922.

Born in Aibonito, Puerto Rico, he obtained his bachelor's degree in San Juan in 1865, a degree in Civil and Canon Law at the University of Salamanca in 1873, and a doctorate in theology.

He began practicing law in 1874 and was a Judge of First Instance in Aguadilla and Mayagüez, Puerto Rico, and Santiago, Cuba.  He served as a Magistrate in Pinar Del Río and Santa Clara, also in Cuba, as well as in Cibú and Manila, in the Philippines, before serving in Puerto Rico under Spanish rule.  After the change of sovereignty to the United States, he was President of Puerto Rico's highest court in 1899 and was appointed Associate Justice of the new Supreme Court in 1900 by president William McKinley, a post held until his appointment as Chief Justice by president William Howard Taft in 1909. Served as Chief Justice until his retirement in 1922.

He died in San Juan, Puerto Rico on June 20, 1932, at the age of 83. He was buried at Santa María Magdalena de Pazzis Cemetery in San Juan, Puerto Rico.

|-

Sources 

La Justicia en sus Manos, by Luis Rafael Rivera, 2007, 

1849 births
1932 deaths
Associate Justices of the Supreme Court of Puerto Rico
Burials at Santa María Magdalena de Pazzis Cemetery
Chief Justices of the Supreme Court of Puerto Rico
People from Aibonito, Puerto Rico
Puerto Rican lawyers
University of Salamanca alumni